The Bishop of Ossory, Ferns and Leighlin was the Ordinary of the Church of Ireland diocese of Ossory, Ferns and Leighlin in the Ecclesiastical Province of Dublin. The diocese consisted of counties Kilkenny, Carlow, Laois and Wexford in Ireland.

History
Under the Church Temporalities (Ireland) Act 1833, the bishopric was formed when the bishopric of Ossory merged with the bishopric of Ferns and Leighlin on 12 July 1835. Over the next one hundred and forty-two years, there were twelve bishops of the united diocese. In 1977, the see merged with bishopric of Cashel and Waterford to form the united bishopric of Cashel and Ossory.

List of bishops of Ossory, Ferns and Leighlin

References

Ossory, Ferns and Leighlin
Religion in County Kilkenny
Religion in County Wexford
Bishops of Kildare or Ferns or Leighlin or of Ossory